Sebastián Óscar Jaime (born January 30, 1987) is an Argentine-born Chilean footballer who plays for Unión Española.

Honours

Club
Argentinos Juniors
 Argentine Primera División (1): 2010 Apertura

Unión Española
 Primera División de Chile (1): 2013 Transición
 Supercopa de Chile (1): 2013

Universidad Católica
 Primera División de Chile (2): 2016 Clausura, 2016 Apertura
 Supercopa de Chile (1): 2016

External links
 
 Sebastián Jaime at Football-Lineups

1987 births
Living people
Argentine footballers
Argentina international footballers
Argentine expatriate footballers
Defensores de Cambaceres footballers
Argentinos Juniors footballers
Deportes La Serena footballers
Unión Española footballers
Real Salt Lake players
Club Deportivo Universidad Católica footballers
Curicó Unido footballers
Argentine Primera División players
Major League Soccer players
Chilean Primera División players
Expatriate footballers in Chile
Expatriate soccer players in the United States
Association football forwards
Naturalized citizens of Chile
Footballers from La Plata